I'll Always Love You is the fourteenth studio album by Canadian country pop artist Anne Murray, released in 1979 via Capitol Records. In the U.S. the album reached #4 on the Billboard Country albums chart and number 24 on the Billboard Pop Albums chart. It achieved American sales of approximately 900,000 copies. It was certified Gold by the Recording Industry Association of America RIAA.

The disc contains Murray's fourth #1 Country hit "Broken Hearted Me". It also contains her revival of The Monkees' 1967 #1 hit "Daydream Believer" which peaked at number 12 on the Billboard Hot 100 chart. The album also contained compositions by Dave Loggins, Rory Bourke, Charlie Black and Jesse Winchester.

The photo on the album cover depicts Murray, seated alone in a restaurant after what appears to be a broken engagement. Murray, who was then pregnant with her daughter Dawn Langstroth, is seated at a table so that her pregnancy is not visible in the photo.

Track listing

Personnel
Anne Murray - vocals
Pat Riccio, Jr, Brian Gatto - keyboards
Jorn Andersen - drums, percussion
Peter Cardinali - bass
Aidan Mason, Brian Russell, Bob Mann - guitar
Bob Lucier - steel guitar, dobro
Rick Wilkins & Peter Cardinali - string and horn arrangements

Charts

Weekly charts

Year-end charts

References

1979 albums
Anne Murray albums
Capitol Records albums
Albums produced by Jim Ed Norman